The Goofy Gophers are animated cartoon characters in Warner Bros.' Looney Tunes and Merrie Melodies series of cartoons. The gophers are small and brown with tan bellies and buck teeth. They both have British accents. Unnamed in the theatrical cartoons, they were given the names Mac and Tosh in the 1960s TV show The Bugs Bunny Show. The names are a pun on the surname "Macintosh". They are characterized by an abnormally high level of politeness.

Creation
The Goofy Gophers were created by Warners animator Bob Clampett for the 1947 short film The Goofy Gophers. Norman McCabe had previously used a pair of gophers in his 1942 short Gopher Goofy, but they bear little resemblance to Clampett's characters. Clampett left the studio before the short went to production, so Arthur Davis took over as director. The cartoon features the gophers' repeated incursions into a vegetable garden guarded by an unnamed dog whom they relentlessly, though politely, torment. Voice actor Mel Blanc plays Mac and Stan Freberg plays Tosh. Both speak with high-pitched British accents like those used in upper-class stereotypes around at the time.

Some sources claim Clampett intended the Goofy Gophers to be a spoof of Disney's chipmunk characters, Chip 'n' Dale, with whom they are sometimes confused. Others, however, point out that this seems unlikely given the two pairs of characters are so different in characterization. The only real similarities are the fact that the characters are rodents, are paired up, and have puns for names.

The gophers' mannerisms and speech were patterned after Frederick Burr Opper's comics characters Alphonse and Gaston, which in the early 1900s engendered a "good honest laugh". The crux of each four-frame strip was the ridiculousness of the characters' overpoliteness preventing their ability to get on with the task at hand.

They may also be influenced by performances from the British film Great Expectations directed by David Lean and released in 1946, one year before Clampett's restyled 1947 version. The gophers' speech and affectations closely mirror the enthusiastic deferential relationship between Pip, played by actor John Mills, and Mr. Pocket played by actor Alec Guinness.

The pair's dialogue is peppered with such overpoliteness as "Indubitably!", "You first, my dear," and "But, no, no, no. It must be you who goes first!" The two often also tend to quote Shakespeare and use humorously long words; for example, in Lumber Jerks, instead of "We have to get our tree back", they say "We must take vital steps to reclaim our property." Clampett later stated that the gophers' mannerisms were derived from character actors Franklin Pangborn and Edward Everett Horton.

Development
Davis would direct one other Goofy Gophers short, 1948's Two Gophers from Texas. The unnamed dog from the first cartoon returns as their nemesis in this cartoon, this time aiming to eat like an animal in the wild as he pursues the gophers with a gopher cookbook in hand.

Robert McKimson was the next Warners director to utilize the characters. He pitted them against Clampett and Arthur's dog once again in the 1949 film A Ham in a Role wherein the dog's efforts to become a Shakespearean actor are foiled by the rambunctious rodents.

The Gophers lay dormant for two years until Friz Freleng made a series of four shorts beginning with 1951's A Bone for a Bone, another dog-versus-gophers short. This was followed by I Gopher You in 1954, featuring the Gophers in their first cartoon without the dog, attempting to retrieve their vegetables from a food processing plant; Pests for Guests in 1955, which has the gophers counter-antagonize the helpless Elmer Fudd when he buys a chest of drawers that they found appropriate for nut storage; and Lumber Jerks later that year, where the Gophers visit a saw mill in an attempt to retrieve their stolen tree home.

After Freleng finished with the characters, they would star in two more cartoons, once again directed by McKimson. These two cartoons, Gopher Broke in 1958 and Tease for Two in 1965, pit the Gophers against the Barnyard Dawg and Daffy Duck, respectively. Both gophers were voiced by Mel Blanc in the latter short instead of one by Blanc and the other by Freberg.

Later appearances
The Goofy Gophers were largely forgotten by Warner Bros. in the years since the animation studio closed in 1969. However, in recent years, they have made a few cameos in various Warner Bros. projects. Two characters resembling the gophers appeared in the 1988 film Who Framed Roger Rabbit, peeking from the brick wall into the factory where Judge Doom was defeated. They are seen briefly in the 1996 movie Space Jam. They're prominently featured in episodes of the animated series The Sylvester and Tweety Mysteries ("I Gopher You") and Duck Dodgers ("K-9 Kaddy" and "Old McDodgers"), which in the latter, they are reinvented as green-furred, six-limbed Martian gophers.

The Goofy Gophers made a cameo appearance in Bah, Humduck! A Looney Tunes Christmas as Daffy's employers.

The Goofy Gophers were revived in The Looney Tunes Show voiced by Rob Paulsen and Jess Harnell. In this show, Mac and Tosh run an antique store. The gophers appeared in the 2015 DTV movie Looney Tunes: Rabbits Run. They also appear in the Looney Tunes comic currently published by DC Comics.

The Goofy Gophers appeared in the New Looney Tunes season 3 episode "Fool's Gold".

The Goofy Gophers made a cameo in the Looney Tunes Cartoons short "Happy Birthday, Bugs Bunny!".

The Goofy Gophers appeared in Bugs Bunny Builders. They first appeared episode "Rock On".

Filmography
 The Goofy Gophers (1947, Bob Clampett & Arthur Davis)
 Two Gophers from Texas (1948, Davis)
 A Ham in a Role (1949, Davis & Robert McKimson)
 A Bone for a Bone (1951, Freleng)
 I Gopher You (1954, Freleng)
 Pests for Guests (1955, Freleng)
 Lumber Jerks (1955, Freleng)
 Gopher Broke (1958, McKimson) 
 Tease for Two (1965, McKimson)

References

Animated duos
Looney Tunes characters
Fictional gophers
Film characters introduced in 1947
Fictional anthropomorphic characters